Rabbit Junk is an American industrial metal band made up of former the Shizit frontman JP Anderson and his wife Jennifer "Sum Grrl" Bernert. The band formed in Seattle in 2004 and are currently active in southern California.

After achieving success with their second album Reframe, Rabbit Junk went on hiatus after the release of their fourth album Project Nonagon, but returned in 2014 after positive reception to several promotional singles. They have since released several EPs and three more studio albums, 2018's Rabbit Junk Will Die!: Meditations on Mortality, 2020's Xenospheres and 2022's Apocalypse for Beginners.

History

Formation, self-titled album and REframe (2004–2006) 
Rabbit Junk started in 2004 after the dissolution of JP Anderson's former band, the Shizit. Anderson asked his wife Jennifer "Sum Grrl" Bernert to provide additional vocals on a demo he was working on, and the duo self-released the demo recordings their debut album Rabbit Junk in 2004. One year later, the band signed to Glitch Mode Recordings and released their second album, REframe, which gained the band a wider fan base.

A video for the song "In Your Head No One Can Hear You Scream" was produced by the Kandycore Design Company. Guitarists Coleman Thornburg and Dan Gardner, as well as drummer Kent Ames, joined Anderson and Bernert as the duo's touring band in 2006.

After REframe was released, Rabbit Junk contributed the song "Industrial Is Dead" to the Glitch Mode compilation CD Hordes of the Elite. Later, a cover of Atari Teenage Riot's "Start The Riot" appeared on the D-Trash Records Atari Teenage Riot tribute album called "The Virus Has Been Spread".

This Life and Project Nonagon (2007–2010) 
In October 2007, the first two Rabbit Junk albums were remastered by Tom Baker (who has worked with Marilyn Manson, Nine Inch Nails and the Bloodhound Gang) when the band signed onto Full Effect Records. Rabbit Junk's third album, This Life Is Where You Get Fucked, was released on April 28, 2008. This Life is divided into three separate three-song suites, exploring different themes and genres within each.

In September 2008, Rabbit Junk released three new songs on their MySpace page for download, titled "Power", "Blood" and "Home", forming the first part of their follow-up to This Life, Project Nonagon - another album divided into three separate parts, all of which act as sequels to the three parts of their previous release. The band released the next three songs in 2009, and the final three were released on the full album in 2010.

After the release of Project Nonagon, Rabbit Junk cut ties with Full Effect Records. Anderson would later state that he felt "isolated" by the label's control over Rabbit Junk's image and interaction with fans, but acknowledged that he didn't believe the label did anything intentionally malicious.

"The Lost Years" (2011–2013) 
After the band's departure from Full Effect Records, Anderson focused his efforts on various side projects throughout 2009 including steampunk-inspired Fighting Ice With Iron, folk metal Wolves Under Sail, and a revival of his old band the Shizit, later rebranded as the Named due to contract disputes with his former bandmembers. From 2011 to 2013, Rabbit Junk released a series of singles which Anderson claims were keeping the project "on life support" after the experiences with Full Effect. After the release of "Break Shins to This" in 2013, and the positive feedback that followed, Anderson decided to move Rabbit Junk's music into a more electronic direction. The band released "From the Ashes" (which contained a sampled riff from "Dead Embryonic Cells" by Sepultura) on a 2013 Christmas sampler by Glitch Mode Recordings, who have distributed all of Rabbit Junk's releases since. The success of these singles led to a 2016 compilation of remastered songs entitled Singles from the Lost Years 2011-2013.

Pop That Pretty Thirty and EPs (2014–2016)
Anderson released a new EP in 2014, titled "Pop That Pretty Thirty", shortly followed by their first live EP, "Live 2014". In January 2015 the band released the "Invasion" EP, with Anderson has since stating in interviews that Rabbit Junk will no longer release full-length albums and will only release extended plays, aiming for two per year, as it allows for more creative freedom and not being confined to fixed concepts.

Rabbit Junk released "Beast" on October 28, 2015. On February 9, 2016, the band released "Singles from the Lost Years 2011–2013", which contained remastered and alternate versions of all the singles that were released in between "Project Nonagon" and "Pop That Pretty Thirty".

Rabbit Junk Will Die: Meditations on Mortality, Xenospheres, and Apocalypse for Beginners (2017–present)
Like the Flesh Does the Knife, an EP of remixes from Beast, Invasion, and Pop That Pretty Thirty, was released in 2017. Rabbit Junk officially announced the release of their "comeback" album, Rabbit Junk Will Die: Meditations on Mortality, in late 2017, and released it January 2018 following the singles "Gravity Hero" and "Become Hell".

In July 2019, Rabbit Junk confirmed that they had re-obtained the rights to their pre-2011 recordings and would be re-releasing the original albums Rabbit Junk, Reframe, This Life Is Where You Get Fucked, and Project Nonagon through Bandcamp with new original artwork by frequent collaborator Andrew Tremblay, and proceeded to release them over the next few months, alongside their newly recorded Reveal EP. In December of that year, Anderson announced another album with a tentative release date for 2020, later titling it Xenospheres. The first single "Bits & Razors" was released in April 2020 and was followed by "Prismatic" in July; the album was released to Bandcamp and streaming success in late 2020.

After releasing the singles "Reckoning" and "Attendance", Anderson and Bernert relocated to southern California in 2021 after Anderson received his Ph.D. The band recorded and released "Denature" in their new studio space in late 2021. Anderson announced the band's forthcoming seventh album Apocalypse for Beginners in early 2022, teasing the release for later that year with the singles "Pathogenesis", "The Grind", and "Bodies".

Apocalypse for Beginners was released on October 21st 2022 and featured 9 tracks, including a feature with Amelia Arsenic. The album was completely independently produced, with JP having recorded, mixed and mastered all the tracks, with Sum Grrl being responsible for vocals on some of the tracks. The album art is a play on "90's how to manuals" and was made by The Iron Parasite. 3 of the album's songs (Bodies, Love Is Hell and The Grind) had been previously released as singles.

Members
 JP Anderson – vocals, guitars, bass guitar, drums, keyboards, programming, songwriting
 Jennifer "Sum Grrl" Bernert – vocals, keyboards, songwriting

Live band
 JP Anderson – vocals, guitar (2004–present)
 Sum Grrl – keyboards, electronics, vocals (2004–present)
 Amelia Arsenic – keyboards, electronics, vocals (2018)
 Coleman Thornburg – guitar (2006–2011)
 Dan Gardner – guitar (2006–2011)
 Kent Ames – drums (2006–2015)

Discography 
Studio albums
 Rabbit Junk (2004, remastered 2008, re-released 2019)
 Reframe (2006, remastered 2008, re-released 2019)
 This Life Is Where You Get Fucked (2008, re-released 2019)
 Project Nonagon (2010, re-released 2019)
 Rabbit Junk Will Die: Meditations On Mortality (2018)
 Xenospheres (2020)
 Apocalypse For Beginners (2022)

Compilations
 Singles from the Lost Years 2011–2013 (2016)
 Consolidate (2016)

Remix albums
 Modified Mortality (2018)

Extended plays
 Hare Brained: The Remixes (Unofficial release) (2005)
 Project Nonagon: The Struggle II (2008)
 Drek Kick: Cyanotic vs Rabbit Junk (2009)
 Project Nonagon: Ghetto Blasphemer II – From the Stars (2009, reissued 2016)
 Pop That Pretty Thirty (2014)
 Invasion (2015)
 Beast (2015)
 Like the Flesh Does the Knife (Remix EP) (2017)
 Reveal (Extended) (2019)

Live extended plays
 Live 2014

Singles / Others
 "Industrial Is Dead" (2006, remastered 2021)
 "Start the Riot'"(2007)
 "What Doesn't Kill You Will Make You a Killer" (2011)
 "Lucid Summations" (2011)
 "Bubble" (2012)
 "Boy with the Sun in His Eyes" (2012)
 "Own Up" (2012)
 "Break Shins to This" (2013)
 "From the Ashes" (2013)
 "T Minus Everything" (2018)
 "Zero (Smashing Pumpkins Cover)" (2019)
 "We Saw the End" (2019)
 "Bits and Razors" (2020)
 "Prismatic" (2020)
 "Reckoning" (2021)
 "Attendance" (2021)
 "Denature" (2021)
 "Pathogenesis" (2022)
 "The Grind" (2022)
 "Bodies" (2022)
 "Love is Hell" (2022)

References

External links 

 Official Website
  
 Rabbit Junk on Facebook
 Rabbit Junk on Instagram
 Rabbit Junk on Twitter
 Rabbit Junk on Spotify
 Rabbit Junk on Bandcamp

Musical groups established in 2004
American drum and bass musical groups
Drum and bass duos
American industrial metal musical groups
Electronic music groups from Washington (state)